"Won't Take It Lying Down" is a song by British-based girl group Honeyz, released as the group's fifth single from their debut studio album, Wonder No. 8 (1998). It was their last single with member Mariama Goodman, who was later replaced by original member Heavenli Abdi.

Track listings
UK Part I
"Won't Take It Lying Down" (Ollie Twist Mix)
"What Does She Look Like?"
"Keep Me Hanging On"
 Enhanced CD includes "Won't Take It Lying Down" video

UK Part II
"Won't Take It Lying Down" (Ollie Twist Mix)
"Won't Take It Lying Down" (LA Mix)
"Won't Take It Lying Down" (Twist Future Mix)

UK cassette single
"Won't Take It Lying Down" (Ollie Twist Mix)
"What Does She Look Like?"
 
Holland CD1 (cardboard sleeve)
"Won't Take It Lying Down" (Ollie Twist Mix)
"What Does She Look Like?"

Holland CD2
"Won't Take It Lying Down" (Ollie Twist Mix)
"Won't Take It Lying Down" (LA Mix)
"What Does She Look Like?"
 Enhanced CD includes "Won't Take It Lying Down" video
 
Promo CD
"Won't Take It Lying Down" (Ollie Twist Mix)
"Won't Take It Lying Down"

Charts

References

1998 songs
1999 singles
Honeyz songs
Mercury Records singles
Songs written by Anders Bagge
Songs written by Arnthor Birgisson
Songs written by Simon Climie